The governor of Iowa is the head of government of the U.S. state of Iowa. The governor is the head of the executive branch of the state government and is charged with enforcing state laws. The officeholder has the power to either approve or veto bills passed by the Iowa General Assembly, to convene the legislature, as well as to grant pardons, except in cases of treason and impeachment. The governor of Iowa is also the commander-in-chief of the state's military forces.

There have been 41 individuals who held the position of Iowa governor, with two of those serving multiple distinct terms, Samuel J. Kirkwood and Terry Branstad. The current governor, Kim Reynolds, is the first woman to hold the position and was sworn in on May 24, 2017. The longest-serving is Terry Branstad, who served from 1983 to 1999 and then again from 2011 to 2017. He is the longest-serving governor in U.S. history, surpassing the previous record of 21 years set by George Clinton of New York. The shortest-serving was Robert D. Fulton, who served 16 days.

Governors of the Territory of Iowa

Iowa Territory was formed on July 4, 1838, from Wisconsin Territory. It had four governors appointed by the President of the United States, though the first resigned days after he was confirmed by the Senate and before ever reaching the territory.

Governors of the State of Iowa

The southeast portion of Iowa Territory was admitted to the Union as the State of Iowa on December 28, 1846. The first Constitution of Iowa, adopted in 1846, created the office of governor with a four-year term, with no specific start date. The 1857 constitution reduced this term to two years, but an amendment in 1972 increased this back to four years. The 1857 constitution also set the start of the term to the second Monday in the January following the election, which was moved one day later by a 1988 amendment.

The office of lieutenant governor was created in the 1857 constitution, elected for the same term as the governor. An amendment in 1988 specified that the lieutenant governor would be elected on the same ticket as the governor. If the office becomes vacant, it devolves upon the lieutenant governor for the remainder of the term or vacancy. Prior to 1857, if the office became vacant, the Secretary of State of Iowa would act as governor. There is no term limit on the number of terms a governor may serve.

See also
Gubernatorial lines of succession in the United States#Iowa

Notes

References

General

 
 

Constitutions

Specific

External links
Governor of Iowa

Lists of state governors of the United States
 
List of Governors
Governors